Yaddi Bolagh (also Romanized as Yaddī Bolāgh) is a village in Dodangeh Rural District, Hurand District, Ahar County, East Azerbaijan Province, Iran. At the 2006 census, its population was 17, in 5 families.

References 

Populated places in Ahar County